Teair Tart (born February 28, 1997) is an American football nose tackle for the Tennessee Titans of the National Football League (NFL). He played college football at ASA, Ellsworth CC, and FIU.

College career
Tart began his collegiate career at ASA College in New York City, where he recorded five sacks in six games before leaving the team after his older brother was killed in a motorcycle accident. Tart briefly enrolled at Valley Forge Military Academy, but transferred to East Mississippi Community College midway through his first semester there. He received an offer from Alabama, which was withdrawn after he was cut from East Mississippi's football team shortly before the beginning of the season. Tart then enrolled at Ellsworth Community College in Kansas and played in two games before suffering a season-ending knee injury. Tart committed to transfer to FIU for the final two seasons of his NCAA eligibility.

In his first season with the FIU Panthers, Tart had 19 tackles, seven tackles for loss, and four sacks with a forced fumble and pass broken up. He recorded 32 tackles, with a team-high 12 tackles for loss, with two sacks and a forced fumble.

Professional career

Tart was signed by the Tennessee Titans as an undrafted free agent on April 25, 2020. Tart was waived on September 5, 2020, during final roster cuts and was signed to the team's practice squad the following day. Tart was signed to the Titans' active roster on November 7, 2020. On December 7, 2020, he was suspended one game  for violations of unnecessary roughness and unsportsmanlike conduct rules after stepping on Cleveland Browns player Wyatt Teller in Week 13. He was reinstated from suspension on December 15, 2020. He was placed on the reserve/COVID-19 list by the team on January 3, 2021, and activated on January 18.

On March 9, 2022, the Titans re-signed Tart to a one-year deal.

Entering the 2023 offseason as a restricted free agent, the Titans placed a second round tender on Tart on March 15, 2023.

References

External links
FIU Panthers bio
Tennessee Titans bio

Living people
American football defensive tackles
FIU Panthers football players
Tennessee Titans players
Players of American football from Philadelphia
Ellsworth Panthers football players
1997 births